Scott Michael Turner (born August 7, 1982) is an American football coach who is the pass game coordinator for the Las Vegas Raiders of the National Football League (NFL). He has also been an assistant coach for the Minnesota Vikings, Cleveland Browns, Carolina Panthers, as well as an offensive coordinator for the Washington Football Team / Commanders. He is the son of former NFL head coach Norv Turner.

Early years
Turner was born in Los Angeles on August 7, 1982. He spent some of his childhood in Coppell, Texas, while his father, Norv, was the offensive coordinator of the Dallas Cowboys teams that won two Super Bowls. He and his family later moved to Northern Virginia in 1994 when Norv became head coach of the Washington Redskins. Turner attended Oakton High School in Vienna, Virginia, where he played quarterback for their football team. Turner attended the University of Nevada, Las Vegas, where he was a reserve member of the UNLV Rebels football team.

Coaching career

Carolina Panthers
In 2011, Turner started his NFL coaching career with the Carolina Panthers under first-year head coach Ron Rivera.  Turner served as the offensive quality control coach for two seasons with the Panthers.

Cleveland Browns
In 2013, Turner was hired by the Cleveland Browns as their wide receivers coach, coaching under his father and offensive coordinator Norv Turner for the first time.

Minnesota Vikings
In 2014, Turner was hired by the Minnesota Vikings as their quarterback coach under his offensive coordinator father, Norv, and first-year head coach Mike Zimmer. He worked closely with Teddy Bridgewater, drafted 32nd overall in the first round of the 2014 NFL Draft.  In 2015, the Vikings won the NFC North division title but lost to the Seattle Seahawks in the wild card. He was fired in January 2017.

Michigan Wolverines
Turner was hired as an offensive analyst under Michigan Wolverines head coach Jim Harbaugh in February 2017.

Return to Carolina
In 2018, Turner returned to the Panthers as their quarterback coach. He was their interim offensive coordinator for the final four games of the 2019 season following head coach Ron Rivera's firing.

Washington Football Team / Commanders 
On January 8, 2020, Turner was hired by the Washington Redskins as their offensive coordinator under head coach Ron Rivera. He signed a multi-year extension with them, by then rebranded as the Commanders, on March 13, 2022, before being dismissed following the end of the 2022 season.

Las Vegas Raiders
Turner joined the Las Vegas Raiders as their pass game coordinator on February 3, 2023.

References

External links
 
 Las Vegas Raiders bio

1982 births
Living people
American football quarterbacks
Carolina Panthers coaches
Cleveland Browns coaches
Minnesota Vikings coaches
Oregon State Beavers football coaches
Pittsburgh Panthers football coaches
UNLV Rebels football players
High school football coaches in Virginia
Oakton High School alumni
Sports coaches from Los Angeles
People from Vienna, Virginia
Players of American football from Virginia
Washington Commanders coaches
Washington Football Team coaches
Washington Redskins coaches
National Football League offensive coordinators
Coaches of American football from California
Coaches of American football from Virginia
Players of American football from Los Angeles
Las Vegas Raiders coaches